The following is a list of the 342 communes of the Hérault department of France.

The communes cooperate in the following intercommunalities (as of 2020):
Montpellier Méditerranée Métropole
Communauté d'agglomération Béziers Méditerranée
Communauté d'agglomération Hérault Méditerranée
Communauté d'agglomération du Pays de l'Or
CA Sète Agglopôle Méditerranée
Communauté de communes Les Avant-Monts
Communauté de communes des Cévennes Gangeoises et Suménoises (partly)
Communauté de communes du Clermontais
Communauté de communes la Domitienne
Communauté de communes Grand Orb
Communauté de communes du Grand Pic Saint-Loup
Communauté de communes Lodévois et Larzac
Communauté de communes du Minervois au Caroux
Communauté de communes des Monts de Lacaune et de la Montagne du Haut Languedoc (partly)
Communauté de communes du Pays de Lunel
Communauté de communes Sud-Hérault
Communauté de communes Vallée de l'Hérault

References

Herault